World War II Behind Closed Doors: Stalin, the Nazis and the West is a 2008 six-episode BBC/PBS documentary series on the role of Joseph Stalin and German-Soviet relations before, during, and after World War II, created by Laurence Rees and Andrew Williams.

It carries new controversial material from the Soviet archives that became available to the public only after the end of the Soviet Union. Each episode lasts approximately one hour and features reenactments of the situations subject.

Background
The 2008 film combines narrative-led documentary segments interwoven by dramatic re-enactments with actors representing main political figures of the period. The original narrative voice-over was performed by Samuel West, while Keith David, a veteran of Ken Burns's PBS series, narrates the American version. Joseph Stalin is portrayed by Alexei Petrenko, Winston Churchill, by Paul Humpoletz, and Franklin D. Roosevelt by Bob Gunton.

The series delves into such matters as the British, American, and Soviet cover-up of the Katyn Forest Massacre; Churchill's agreement at Yalta that Stalin should keep his gains of the Nazi-Soviet Pact, including Poland's prewar Kresy (eastern borderlands); the Polish population transfers (1944–1946); and the betrayal or persecution of figures such as Marshal Georgy Zhukov, Vyacheslav Molotov, and John H. Noble. The British historian Laurence Rees did the research compilation and the lead writing for the series, and the drama was directed by Andrew Williams.

Episodes

Cast
 Aleksei Petrenko as Joseph Stalin
 Bob Gunton as Franklin D. Roosevelt
 Paul Humpoletz as Winston Churchill
 Ziyad Abou Chair as Adolf Hitler
 Michael J. Reynolds as George C. Marshall
 Simon Thorp as Anthony Eden
 Valery Zhakov as Vyacheslav Molotov
 Krzysztof Dracz as Lavrentiy Beria
 Richard Alleman as Harry S. Truman

Companion book 
Rees, Laurence (2008). World War II Behind Closed Doors: Stalin, the Nazis and the West. Barnes & Nobles Publishing. .

See also
 How Hitler Lost the War
 Hitler's Warriors
 Soviet Storm: World War II in the East
 World War II In HD Colour

References

External links
 

Documentary television series about World War II
Documentary films about the Soviet Union in the Stalin era
2008 documentary films
2008 films
British documentary films
2000s British films